The western bent-winged bat (Miniopterus magnater) is a species of vesper bat in the family Miniopteridae. It can be found in the following countries: China, India, Indonesia, Laos, Malaysia, Myanmar, Papua New Guinea, Thailand, Timor-Leste, and Vietnam.

References

Miniopteridae
Bats of Asia
Bats of Oceania
Bats of Southeast Asia
Bats of Indonesia
Bats of Malaysia
Mammals of Myanmar
Mammals of China
Mammals of Timor
Mammals of India
Mammals of Laos
Bats of New Guinea
Mammals of Papua New Guinea
Mammals of Thailand
Mammals of Vietnam
Mammals of Western New Guinea
Least concern biota of Asia
Least concern biota of Oceania
Mammals described in 1931
Taxonomy articles created by Polbot
Taxa named by Colin Campbell Sanborn